Smuts Pass is a mountain pass situated in the Eastern Cape province of South Africa, on the road between Dordrecht, Eastern Cape and Molteno.

References

Mountain passes of the Eastern Cape